Bois-le-Roi may refer to:

 Bois-le-Roi, Eure, a commune in Eure département, France
 Bois-le-Roi, Seine-et-Marne, a commune in Seine-et-Marne département, France